Gummerus Oy is a Finnish media group that was founded in Jyväskylä in 1872 by Kaarle Jaakko Gummerus. In 1985, it moved its headquarters from Jyväskylä to Helsinki. In 2008, it had an annual turnover of EUR 26,9 million. Annually, it publishes approximately 200 new titles, which are sold in bookstores, department stores and book clubs.

Gummerus Oy consists of four divisions: 
 Gummerus Kustannus Oy
 Kielikone Oy 
 Kirjatori Oy 
 Gummerus Kiinteistöt Oy

In December 2009 Gummerus and Sanoma agreed on an arrangement concerning the merger of WS Bookwell and Gummerus Printing. As a result of the arrangement, Gummerus Oy became a shareholder in the new Bookwell Oy with a 20% holding.

In May 2001 Gummerus Publishers acquired an independent, smaller publishing firm by the name of Ajatus Kustannusosakeyhtiö, and Ajatus Kirjat remains an editorially independent non-fiction entity within the main publishing firm. Jaakko Syrjä served as an editor.

Establishing
Karl Jacob Gummerus, Kaarle Jaakko Gummerus, finnish, (April 13, 1840 Kokkola – March 20, 1898 Helsinki) begin to publish Kyläkirjasto reader in 1872. It is estimated that the Gummerus Oy publishing company actually started then in Jyväskylä.

Karl and his wife Gustava wanted to bring knowledge and joy to folk. Finally he became a writer.

Works

Ylhäiset ja alhaiset (1870)
, companys first published book. Alkuperäisiä suomalaisia uuteloita (1863–73), Haudankaivajan kertomuksia and Vanhan pastorin muistelmia.

References

External links
Gummerus

Mass media companies of Finland
Mass media in Jyväskylä